Dionisio Petra, O.S.B. (1630 – June 1698) was a Roman Catholic prelate who served as Bishop of Capri (1683–1698).

Biography
Dionisio Petra was born in Vasto Girardi, Italy in 1630 and ordained a priest in the Order of Saint Benedict.
On 12 July 1683, he was appointed during the papacy of Pope Innocent XI as Bishop of Capri.
He served as Bishop of Capri until his death in June 1698.

References

External links and additional sources
 (for Chronology of Bishops) 
 (for Chronology of Bishops) 

17th-century Italian Roman Catholic bishops
Bishops appointed by Pope Innocent XI
1630 births
1698 deaths
Benedictine bishops